The Oregon Electric Railway Museum is the largest streetcar/trolley museum in the Pacific Northwest of the United States. It is owned and operated by the Oregon Electric Railway Historical Society and is located in Brooks, Oregon, on the grounds of Powerland Heritage Park (formerly known as Antique Powerland).

History

It was named Glenwood Electric Railway "Trolley Park" or, more commonly, the Trolley Park, but its formal name in later years was the same as that of the present museum. The Glenwood museum was built on the site of a former steam logging railroad, and OERHS re-equipped the former sawmill building of the Consolidated Timber Company as a four-track carbarn.

Operation at the Glenwood site ended in autumn 1995.

Current operations

The current museum opened in Brooks in 1996. The museum consists of about one mile of mainline track with overhead wire. There is a four-track carbarn to store the international collection of streetcars.

The museum is open from May through October with trolley operations on Saturdays. The big event of the year is the annual Steam-Up, held on the last weekend of July and the first weekend of August. Thousands of riders use the trolley during these two weekends.

Collection

See also
 Heritage streetcar
 Streetcars in North America

References

External links

Oregon Electric Railway Museum - official site
Five videos on Youtube by subwaymark shows footage of the museum and cars in operation. Also details the move to the new location.
Video on history of OERHS by "Powerland Heritage Park". Youtube channel: https://www.youtube.com/user/AntiquePowerland

1959 establishments in Oregon
Museums established in 1959
Museums in Marion County, Oregon
Railroad museums in Oregon
Street railway museums in the United States
Streetcars in Oregon
Historical society museums in Oregon
Heritage railroads in Oregon